XHZV-FM is a community radio station in Zapotitlán de Vadillo, Jalisco. It broadcasts on 107.9 FM and is known as Radio Zapotitlán.

History
XHZV began operations in 2000 and received its permit on December 22, 2004.

References

Radio stations in Jalisco
Community radio stations in Mexico
Radio stations established in 2000